This is a list of countries by fluorite in 2006 mostly based on British Geological Survey accessed in July 2008.

* indicates "Natural resources of COUNTRY or TERRITORY" links.

External links
British Geological Survey complete list

Lists of countries by mineral production
Fluorite